USS Spot (SS-413) was a Balao-class submarine of the United States Navy, named for the spot, a small sciaenoid food fish of the Atlantic coast, with a black spot behind its shoulders.

Construction and commissioning
Spot was laid down on 24 August 1943 by the Mare Island Navy Yard at Vallejo, California. She was launched on 19 May 1944, sponsored by Mrs. A. A. Gieselmann, and commissioned on 3 August 1944, Commander William S. Post, Jr., in command.

U.S. Navy service

September–November 1944 

Spot completed fitting out at Mare Island on 18 September 1944 and moved to San Diego for shakedown. After a yard period, Spot departed for Hawaii and arrived at Pearl Harbor on 14 November 1944.

First patrol, December 1944 – January 1945 

They were joined by  en route, and the trio arrived at Saipan on 15 December 1944.

Two days later, the hunter-killer group headed for the Yellow Sea. On 7 January 1945, Spot sank two small trawlers with her deck gun. Four days later, she destroyed a small freighter by gunfire. On 13 January off Shanghai, the submarine sank two trawlers by shellfire, and she repeated the feat the next day. In a night sweep through the Elliott Islands on 18 and 19 January, Spot torpedoed a cargo ship and a tanker.

As Spot came down the west coast of Korea, she sighted a small ship and fired her last three torpedoes. All ran shallow and missed. The enemy made an unsuccessful attempt to ram. No one manned the Japanese ship's machine gun atop her pilot house; her top deck was in shambles; and the ship was dead in the water but not sinking.

Spot waited for an hour and then sent over a boarding party of seven men to plant demolition charges and search for intelligence material. After about ten minutes on board, the party had to abandon as the ship listed to port and sank by the stern. The boarding party was recovered and one Japanese prisoner taken. The submarine returned to Midway on 30 January for a refit and training period.

Second war patrol, February – March 1945 

On 24 February, Spot began her second war patrol which took her, and  into the East China Sea. On the second night in her assigned patrol area, Spot expended all torpedoes attacking a Japanese convoy. They sank the passenger-cargo ship, Nanking Maru, and damaged a freighter. The attack was made in heavy weather and shallow water. Spot manned her guns and returned the fire even though she was wallowing heavily in the rough seas. A lucky hit by her  gun knocked out W-17's forward gun and saved the submarine from almost certain disaster. Spot secured her guns, cleared the bridge, and submerged. The escort dropped a few depth charge patterns which caused no damage, and the submarine returned to Saipan on 23 March to reload.

On 27 March 1945, Spot resumed her patrol. Spot maneuvered to close when the destroyer turned towards her and increased its speed. Spot fired a recognition flare that the destroyer answered with a second salvo. As Spot submerged, another salvo straddled her conning tower. Spot suffered no damage or casualties in this friendly fire incident.

Third and fourth war patrols, April – July 1945 

During the first week of April, Spot guarded the approaches to Kii Suido. After aircraft from the Fast Carrier Task Force sank battleship Yamato, a cruiser, and four destroyers in the East China Sea on 7 April, the submarine patrolled in that area. She hunted off the China coast and then conducted a reconnaissance of Kokuzan To, off Korea and decided to shell a radio station on the northwest tip of the island. On the evening of 25 April, she surfaced and began the bombardment which hit an oil storage area, several barracks, and set the radio station on fire. Spot returned to the Mariana Islands on 4 May for refit.

Spot began her last war patrol on 2 June and performed lifeguard services off the coast of Honshū until 23 June. She then patrolled in the East China and Yellow Seas, sinking two junks by gunfire before returning to Saipan on 18 July. The submarine sailed for Hawaii the next day.

Spot arrived at Pearl Harbor on 29 July for an extended overhaul and was still there when hostilities ceased. She sailed for San Diego on 27 August and provided services for antisubmarine warfare units there from 3 September 1945 to 2 March 1946. The ship then sailed to San Francisco to prepare for inactivation. She was decommissioned at the Mare Island Naval Shipyard on 19 June and attached to the Pacific Reserve Fleet.

Honors and awards 
Spot received four battle stars for World War II service.

Chilean Navy service 

In January 1961, Spot was towed to Pearl Harbor for modernization in preparation for transfer to the Chilean Navy.  A streamlined sail was added but, unusually for a post-World War II submarine, her deck gun was retained.

The Chilean crew reported aboard later in 1961 for training, and on 12 January 1962, Spot was loaned to that government under the Military Assistance Loan Program. She was renamed Simpson (SS-21), in honor of Chilean admiral Robert Winthrop Simpson (1799–1877). The submarine arrived in Chile on 23 April 1962.

On 1 August 1975 the submarine was sold outright to Chile, and struck from the US Navy Directory. In 1980, Simpson was used extensively by director Kinji Fukasaku in the disaster film Fukkatsu no hi (titled in EnglishVirus and Day of Resurrection).  The film features spectacular footage of Simpson operating in the Antarctic.

Simpson was significant for being one of the last submarines to have a deck gun; she was disposed of by the Chilean Navy in 1982.

References

Citations

Bibliography
 Hinman, Charles R., and Douglas E. Campbell. The Submarine Has No Friends: Friendly Fire Incidents Involving U.S. Submarines During World War II. Syneca Research Group, Inc., 2019. .

External links 

Kill record: USS Spot
armada.cl: Simpson

Balao-class submarines
Ships built in Vallejo, California
1944 ships
World War II submarines of the United States
Balao-class submarines of the Chilean Navy
Maritime incidents in March 1945
Friendly fire incidents of World War II